Theill Drengsgaard (6 March 1927 – 2 December 2014) was a Danish footballer. He played in two matches for the Denmark national football team from 1956 to 1957.

References

External links
 
 

1927 births
2014 deaths
Danish men's footballers
Denmark international footballers
People from Viborg Municipality
Association football goalkeepers
Skovshoved IF players